Robert Mackay Keddie (born 10 May 1946) is a former Australian rules footballer who played with  in the Victorian Football League (VFL) and West Adelaide, South Adelaide and Glenelg in the South Australian National Football League (SANFL).

Career
Keddie made his debut for Hawthorn in 1965 and in the subsequent seasons became a highly effective half forward flanker for the club. He was Hawthorn's Best & Fairest winner in 1967 and 1969 and for his performances at the 1969 Adelaide Carnival for Victoria he earned All Australian selection. In 1967 Keddie was selected in the first Australian Team to tour Ireland and the USA to play Gaelic Football.

During the 1970 VFL season Keddie kicked 47 goals for the year. He was overshadowed, however, by teammate Peter Hudson who kicked 146 goals.

In the 1971 VFL Grand Final against St Kilda, Hawthorn were down by 21 points when Keddie was pushed to full forward (and Hudson to centre half forward). They went on to win the game by seven points, with Keddie kicking four final-quarter goals and gaining hero status.  In the week prior a church billboard in the team's eponymous home suburb carried the question "What would you do if Christ came to Hawthorn?", to which some wag had added "Move Peter Hudson to Centre Half-Forward".  Thus Hawthorn fans regarded this move, when it actually happened during the game, as a good omen and Bob Keddie as a sort of saviour.

Keddie worked as a physical education teacher in the Victorian State School system at Belle Vue State school in his early teaching. He went on to Teach and Coach School Sports Teams up to Year 12 

Keddie left Hawthorn at the end of the 1972 VFL season  and became captain and coach of West Adelaide. Keddie played 18 games, kicking 14 goals and winning The Bloods Best & Fairest before moving on to South Adelaide as captain in 1974, playing 53 games, kicking 71 goals and winning South's Best and Fairest in 1975. In 1977 Keddie played a final season with Glenelg, playing seven games and kicking two goals. During this time Keddie also played five games for South Australia; three against Victoria and one each against Western Australia and Tasmania, kicking four goals.

Keddie's younger brother Richard played reserves football for Hawthorn.

Post playing
In 1979 Keddie became the State Development Manager for the Junior Football Council of Victoria under Ray Allsop (Governed by the VFL and Victorian State Government)) setting up parent groups throughout Victoria to initiate what is now known as 'AUSKICK'. This was supported by a Development Officer (Player) from each of the VFL Clubs. In 1981 he became the full-time Development Manager for the Hawthorn FC. before returning to teaching at Wesley College in 1984. Keddie was appointed as an assistant coach to Allan Jeans in 1980 and coached Hawthorn Under 19's Team to 2 Finals.

In 1984 Keddie was appointed as senior coach at Victorian Football Association (VFA) club Sandringham. He coached them to the 1985 flag. In 1987 Keddie was appointed as David Parkins' senior assistant coach before returning to Sandringham in 1988.

He continued his teaching career into the 1980s, at Wesley College until 1987. In 1991–93 Keddie coached South Launceston Football Club in the Tasmanian Football League. This is where his only child, Alexandra Keddie (born 1992), was born. He now resides back in Melbourne and is currently retired, but does some voluntary coaching work and player mentoring at the Frankston Football Club.

References

Sources
Holmesby, Russell and Main, Jim (2007). The Encyclopedia of AFL Footballers. 7th ed. Melbourne: Bas Publishing.

External links

1946 births
Hawthorn Football Club players
Hawthorn Football Club Premiership players
Peter Crimmins Medal winners
Glenelg Football Club players
South Adelaide Football Club players
West Adelaide Football Club players
West Adelaide Football Club coaches
Sandringham Football Club coaches
All-Australians (1953–1988)
Living people
Australian rules footballers from Melbourne
One-time VFL/AFL Premiership players